South Africa women's junior national goalball team is the women's junior national team of South Africa. It takes part in international goalball competitions.

World championships 
The 2005 Junior World Championships were held in Colorado Springs, Colorado.  The team was one of three teams participating, and they finished third overall.

References

National junior women's goalball teams
Goalball in South Africa
goalball
Parasports in South Africa